The Shokihaze goby (Tridentiger barbatus) is a species of goby native to marine and brackish waters along the coasts of eastern Asia.  It has also been introduced to the San Francisco Bay in California, United States.  This species can reach a length of  SL.

References

Shokihaze goby
Fish of the Pacific Ocean
Fish of East Asia
Fish of Taiwan
Fish of Japan
Fish of China
Fish described in 1861
Taxa named by Albert Günther